Thomas Hertog is a Belgian cosmologist at KU Leuven university and was a key collaborator of Professor Stephen Hawking.

Early life
Thomas Hertog was born on 27 May 1975. He graduated Summa cum laude from KU Leuven in 1997 with an MSc degree in physics. He obtained his Master's degree at the University of Cambridge in Part III of the Mathematical Tripos and obtained a Ph.D. degree at Cambridge with a thesis on the origins of cosmic expansion under the supervision of Stephen Hawking.

Career
Hertog had the opportunity to conduct research with Stephen Hawking in the field of cosmic inflation, a branch of the Big Bang theory.

He then worked as a researcher at the University of California - Santa Barbara in the United States and the Université de Paris VII in France. He became a fellow at CERN in Geneva in 2005. In October 2011, Hertog was appointed professor at the Institute for Theoretical Physics at KU Leuven through the Odysseus program of the Flemish government. He led a research group studying the relationship between the Big Bang and string theory, with the idea that concepts like space and time lose their meaning. He also emphasized Georges Lemaître's insight that the Big Bang is central to Einstein's gravitational waves. Hertog worked in the field of quantum cosmology and string theory with James Hartle and Stephen Hawking. In 2011, after years of research, they came to a new insight by combining the mathematics of quantum cosmology and that of string theory.

Selected publications

Books

Journal articles

References

External links 
https://www.researchgate.net/profile/Thomas_Hertog

Belgian physicists
Living people
Alumni of the University of Cambridge
1975 births
Academic staff of KU Leuven
People associated with CERN